"I know that my Redeemer liveth" is a quote from the 19th chapter of the Book of Job. In music it may also refer to:

English
 "I know that my Redeemer liveth", the movement with which Part III of Handel's Messiah opens

German
In German the phrase translates as "Ich weiß, daß mein Erlöser lebt" (and several spelling variants):
 "Ich weiß, daß mein Erlöser lebt", a German hymn, for instance included in the Neu Leipziger Gesangbuch
 Ich weiß, dass mein Erlöser lebt, ABA I, 7, by Johann Michael Bach
 Ich weiß, daß mein Erlöser lebt, TWV 1:877, a cantata by Georg Philipp Telemann, formerly, as BWV 160, also attributed to Johann Sebastian Bach
 "Ich weiß, daß mein Erlöser lebet", K. 572/33, from Mozart's German version of Handel's Messiah.